Raj Bhavan, Tamil Nadu may refer to:

 Raj Bhavan, Chennai, official residence of the governor of Tamil Nadu, located in Chennai.
 Raj Bhavan, Ooty, official residence of the governor of Tamil Nadu, located in Ooty.